Narok  is a village in the administrative district of Gmina Dąbrowa, within Opole County, Opole Voivodeship, in southern Poland. 

The village has a population of 300.

The name of the village is of Polish origin and comes from the word nur, which means "loon".

References

Narok